The Twin Cities Daily Planet, in operation from 2006 until 2019, was an independent website specializing in news events in the Minneapolis – Saint Paul metropolitan area.  The Twin Cities Daily Planet was a community-edited news source. It published original reported news articles, articles republished from other local and ethnic media partners, and some content articles published by affiliated local and neighborhood blogs.  The Daily Planet described itself as a purveyor of "hyperlocal journalism."  The Daily Planet was profiled in the Columbia Journalism Review in 2011.

In 2009, the Daily Planet won overall Minnesota honors as the "best independent online news website" in the annual list of Page One honors bestowed by the Minnesota chapter of the Society of Professional Journalists.
In August and September 2015, the Daily Planet went through a massive restructuring in which almost all staff were laid off as part of the newspaper's conversion into a mouthpiece for issues journalism. Some members of the Daily Planet staff went on to found the Twin Cities Arts Reader.  As of July 2021, no new articles had been posted on the Daily Planet's website since 2019.

See also

 Daily Planet (Philadelphia newspaper)
 Berkeley Daily Planet
 Asheville Daily Planet
 Telluride Daily Planet
 Daily Planet DC

References

External links
Twin Cities Daily Planet
Twin Cities Media Alliance

American news websites
Local mass media in the United States
Mass media in Minneapolis–Saint Paul
Newspapers published in Minnesota
Publications established in 2006
Publications disestablished in 2019